Sardinella melanura (blacktip sardinella) is a species of ray-finned fish in the genus Sardinella.

Footnotes 
 

melanura
Fish described in 1829
Taxa named by Georges Cuvier